Patrice McAllister is a US-flagged tugboat operated by McAllister Towing of New York, LLC.
The vessel caught fire in Canadian waters, near Kingston, Ontario, on Lake Ontario, while travelling from Toledo, Ohio, en route to Staten Island, New York, on 27 March 2012. The Canadian Coast Guard rescued all six crew members, but her chief engineer died the next day. All of her crew were US citizens.
 and Canadian and American helicopters and aircraft were deployed to help rescue the crew.
The vessel remained adrift after the crew were evacuated. A towboat from Clayton, New York salvaged the vessel and towed her to Clayton.

McAllister had operated an earlier vessel of the same name which sank off the coast of New Jersey in 1976.

References

1977 ships
Maritime incidents in 2012
2012 disasters in Canada
Tugboats of the United States